Mark Kelly (born 1964) is an American astronaut and current U.S. Senator from Arizona.

Mark Kelly may also refer to:

 Mark Kelly (bassist) (born 1956), American bass guitarist of the band Petra
 Mark Kelly (footballer, born 1966), English association football player
 Mark Kelly (footballer, born 1969), English-born Irish association football player
 Mark Kelly (general) (born 1956), Australian soldier
 Mark Kelly (keyboardist) (born 1961), Irish-British musician of the band Marillion
 Mark Kelly (hurler) (born 1988), Irish hurler
 Mark D. Kelly (born c. 1962), American military officer

See also
 Mark Kelley, Canadian journalist
 Kelly (surname)